Plasmodium booliati is a parasite of the genus Plasmodium subgenus Vinckeia. As in all Plasmodium species, P. booliati has both vertebrate and insect hosts. The vertebrate hosts for this parasite are mammals.

Taxonomy 
The parasite was first described by Sandosham et al. in 1965.

Distribution 
This species occurs in Malaya.

Vectors
Not known.

Hosts 
The only known host of this species is the Malayan giant flying squirrel.

References 

booliati